Jack O'Connell (16 July 1902 – 24 August 1975) was an Australian rules footballer who played with South Melbourne in the Victorian Football League (VFL).

O'Connell was a successful sprinter, winning the Geelong Gift in 1923, and played on the wing for Williamstown before moving to South Melbourne.

O’Connell coached Ararat in 1925.

Notes

External links 

Jack O'Connell's playing statistics from The VFA Project

1902 births
1975 deaths
Australian rules footballers from Victoria (Australia)
Williamstown Football Club players
Sydney Swans players
Australian rules football coaches